The 2016 United States presidential election in Rhode Island took place on November 8, 2016, as part of the 2016 United States presidential election in which all 50 states plus the District of Columbia participated. Rhode Island voters chose four electors to represent them in the Electoral College via a popular vote.

Although a "safe blue state", Trump improved on Romney's performance; Romney lost the state by 27 points, whereas Trump lost by less than 16 points. This makes it the smallest win by a Democrat since Democratic nominee Michael Dukakis in 1988. In 2012, Mitt Romney won only three towns in Rhode Island. Donald Trump won 14 towns and even narrowly flipped Kent County, making this the first time a Republican has won a county in the state since Ronald Reagan in 1984.

As of 2020, this was the last election in which the towns of Lincoln, Richmond, and West Warwick backed the Republican candidate for president. All three towns had a long history of voting for Democrats before Trump won them in 2016, but in 2020 they were won by Joe Biden. The other nine towns that Trump flipped in 2016 remained Republican in 2020, a sign that Republican gains in Rhode Island in 2016 marked the beginning of a small realignment in state politics, especially among white working class voters.

Primaries

Democratic primary

Four candidates appeared on the Democratic presidential primary ballot:
Bernie Sanders
Hillary Clinton
Rocky De La Fuente
Mark Stewart

Republican primary
Three candidates appeared on the Republican presidential primary ballot:
Ted Cruz
John Kasich
Donald Trump

General election

Predictions

Results

Results by county

Counties that flipped from Democratic to Republican
 Kent (largest city: Warwick)

Results by congressional district
Clinton won both congressional districts.

Results by Municipality

Municipalities that flipped from Democratic to Republican
Burrillville (Providence County)
Coventry (Kent County)
Exeter (Washington County)
Foster (Providence County)
Glocester (Providence County)
Hopkinton (Washington County)
Johnston (Providence County)
Lincoln (Providence County)
North Smithfield (Providence County)
Richmond (Washington County)
Smithfield (Providence County)
West Warwick (Kent County)

Municipalities that flipped from Republican to Democratic
East Greenwich (Kent County)

See also
 United States presidential elections in Rhode Island
 2016 Democratic Party presidential debates and forums
 2016 Democratic Party presidential primaries
 2016 Republican Party presidential debates and forums
 2016 Republican Party presidential primaries

References

External links
 RNC 2016 Republican Nominating Process 
 Green papers for 2016 primaries, caucuses, and conventions

RI
2016
Presidential